Duperrea is a monotypic genus of flowering plants in the family Rubiaceae. The genus contains only one species, viz. Duperrea pavettifolia, which is found in southern China and Indochina.

Varieties 
Duperrea pavettifolia var. pavettifolia
Duperrea pavettifolia var. scabra Pit.

References 

Monotypic Rubiaceae genera
Gardenieae
Flora of China
Flora of Indo-China